Circulating auto-antibodies in the human body can target normal parts of the skin leading to disease.  This is a list of antigens in the skin that may become targets of circulating auto-antibodies leading to the various types of pemphigus.

Footnotes

See also 
 List of target antigens in pemphigoid
 List of conditions caused by problems with junctional proteins
 List of immunofluorescence findings for autoimmune bullous conditions
 List of cutaneous conditions
 List of genes mutated in cutaneous conditions
 List of histologic stains that aid in diagnosis of cutaneous conditions

References 

 
 

Cutaneous conditions
Dermatology-related lists